The Sailor's Daughter is a comedy play by the British writer Richard Cumberland which first premiered on 7 April 1804 at the Theatre Royal, Drury Lane.

Plot 
After a young woman, Julia, is orphaned following the Battle of Copenhagen she enjoys a series of adventures until settling down with her long-lost guardian Captain Sentamore. The play is set in Bath.

Reception 
The first performance received a mixed reception with the house "divided in opinion". A review in Lloyd's Evening Post described it as: "marked with several traits of a muse whose labours have contributed in this department to the improvement of the English drama, but is, upon the whole, far inferior to the pieces from which the author has acquired his deserved celebrity."

Actors 
The original Drury Lane cast included:
 Mr Wroughton (Richard Wroughton) as Sir Mathew Moribund
 Mr Dwyer as Mandeville
 Mr Pope (Alexander Pope) as Captain Sentamour
 Mr Russell as Varnish
 Mr Caulfield (Thomas Caulfield) as Singleton
 Mr Bannister, jun. (John Bannister) as Hartshorn, an apothecary
 Mr Bartley (George Bartley) as Lindsay
 Mr Dowton (William Dowton) as Raven, Sir Mathew's servant
 Mr Evans as Shopman to Hartshorn
 Mr Rhodes as Servant to Varnish
 Mr Webb as Servant to Sir Mathew
 Mrs Jordan (Dorothea Jordan) as Louisa Davenant
 Mrs H. Johnston as Julia Clareville
 Mrs Sparks (Sarah Sparks) as Mrs Hartshorn
 Mrs Maddocks as Nurse

References

Bibliography
 Ennis, Daniel James. Enter the Press Gang: Naval Impressment in Eighteenth-Century British Literature. Associated University Presses, 2002.

Plays by Richard Cumberland
1804 plays
West End plays
British plays